Cape Elizabeth is a town in Cumberland County, Maine, United States. The town is part of the Portland–South Portland–Biddeford, Maine, metropolitan statistical area. As of the 2020 census, Cape Elizabeth had a population of 9,535.

Cape Elizabeth is the location of the Beach to Beacon 10K road race that starts at Crescent Beach State Park (the "beach") and ends at Portland Head Light (the "beacon"). The race draws runners from all parts of the U.S. and elite athletes from around the world.

Cape Elizabeth has a single community school department. The Cape Elizabeth High School's team name is the "Capers".

History

English explorer Bartholomew Gosnold arrived at Cape Elizabeth in May 1602, during his explorations of what would later be called New England. At the southern tip of the promontory, Richmond Island was visited around 1605 by Samuel de Champlain and was the site of a trading post in 1628. John Smith explored and mapped New England in 1615, and gave names to places mainly based on the names used by Native Americans. When Smith presented his map to King Charles I, he suggested that the king should feel free to change any of the Indian names to English ones. The king made many such changes, but only four survive today, one of which is Cape Elizabeth, which Charles named in honor of his sister, Elizabeth of Bohemia.

The first habitation by Europeans was on Richmond Island. Without title, Walter Bagnall (called "Great Walt") in 1628 established a trading post, dealing in rum and beaver skins. "His principal purpose appears to have been to drive a profitable trade with the Indians," writes historian George J. Varney, "without scruple about his methods." His cheating caught up with him in October 1631, when he was killed by the Indians, who also burned down his trading post.

Two months later, the Plymouth Company granted Richmond Island to Robert Trelawney and Moses Goodyear, merchants of Plymouth, England, who made it a center for fisheries and trade. By 1638, Trelawney employed 60 men in the fisheries. The first settlers on the mainland were George Cleeve and Richard Tucker, who settled in 1630 on the shore opposite the island, near the Spurwink River. They worked at planting, fishing and trading. Two years later they were driven off by John Winter, Trelawny's agent. In 1636, Sir Ferdinando Gorges, lord proprietor of Maine, gave Cleeve and Tucker a grant of  including the neck of land called Machegonne—now Portland. In 1643 English Parliamentarian Alexander Rigby bought the large existing Plough of Lygonia patent, which included Cape Elizabeth.

The Cape Elizabeth settlement on the Fore River was known as Purpoodock. It was attacked during King Philip's War in 1675. During King William's War, in Major Benjamin Church's second expedition a year later on 11 September 1690, he arrived with 300 men at Casco Bay. He went up the Androscoggin River to Fort Pejepscot (present-day Brunswick, Maine).  From there he went  upriver and attacked a native village. Three or four native men were shot while retreating; Church discovered five captive New Englanders in the wigwams; six or seven prisoners were summarily killed as an example; and nine prisoners were taken. A few days later, in retaliation, the natives attacked Church at Cape Elizabeth on Purpooduc Point, killing seven of his men and wounding 24 others.  On September 26, Church returned to Portsmouth, New Hampshire.

In 1703, during Queen Anne's War, the town was destroyed. It was resettled about 1719 or 1720.

Cape Elizabeth became Maine's 23rd town on November 1, 1765, when it separated from Falmouth, as Portland was then known. Its first town meeting was held on December 2, 1765. South Portland separated in 1895 from Cape Elizabeth, which contains a number of houses designed by John Calvin Stevens.

In 1872, construction of a US Army coast artillery fort began around Portland Head Light, which in 1899 was named Fort Williams, after Major General Seth Williams of the Civil War. The fort was to guard the southern entrance to Portland Harbor. Active between 1899 and 1962, the fort was then purchased by the town for about $200,000. Today, Fort Williams Park includes Portland Head Light and museum, some remains of the military fort, the ruins of Goddard Mansion, tennis courts, a baseball diamond and grandstand, and other recreation facilities. The park is maintained by the town and has a pay display parking system to assist with park repairs.

Geography

The nearest city is South Portland. Cape Elizabeth shares a border with South Portland to the north and Scarborough to the west.

The town includes two islands. Ram Island is a small and unoccupied island southwest of Richmond Island. This should not be confused with Ram Island Ledge which contains Ram Island Ledge Light and is within Portland, Maine. The  Richmond Island, originally inhabited by Native Americans, then English settlers, is now uninhabited except by a small herd of sheep. It is privately owned by the Sprague family, the most prominent property owners in Cape Elizabeth, whose substantial estate also includes Ram Island Farm on the mainland.

Cape Elizabeth is the home of three coastal parks: Fort Williams Park, Two Lights State Park, and Crescent Beach State Park. Additionally, the Cape Elizabeth Land Trust, a private nonprofit corporation, protects  of land on 22 different parcels for public use, maintaining a large system of connecting non-motorized trails on most.

The town itself has 923 acres of land owned or under easement protection for conservation purposes.

Demographics

2010 census
As of the census of 2010, there were 9,015 people, 3,616 households, and 2,620 families living in the town. The racial makeup of the town was 96.6% White, 0.5% African American, 0.2% Native American, 1.4% Asian, 0.1% Pacific Islander, 0.3% from other races, and 1.0% from two or more races. Hispanic or Latino of any race were 1.4% of the population.

There were 3,616 households, of which 33.5% had children under the age of 18 living with them, 62.5% were married couples living together, 7.3% had a female householder with no husband present, 2.7% had a male householder with no wife present, and 27.5% were non-families. 22.9% of all households were made up of individuals, and 10.7% had someone living alone who was 65 years of age or older. The average household size was 2.49 and the average family size was 2.95.

The median age in the town was 46.8 years. 25% of residents were under the age of 18; 4.5% were between the ages of 18 and 24; 17.3% were from 25 to 44; 37.3% were from 45 to 64; and 16.1% were 65 years of age or older. The gender makeup of the town was 48.2% male and 51.8% female.

2000 census
As of the census of 2000, there were 9,068 people, 3,488 households, and 2,605 families living in the town. The racial makeup of the town was 98% White, 0.3% African American, 0.06% Native American, 0.99% Asian, 0.06% Pacific Islander, 0.12% from other races, and 0.49% from two or more races. Hispanic or Latino of any race were 0.50% of the population.

There were 3,488 households, out of which 36.0% had children under the age of 18 living with them, 65.7% were married couples living together, 6.5% had a female householder with no husband present, and 25.3% were non-families. 21.1% of all households were made up of individuals, and 9.9% had someone living alone who was 65 years of age or older. The average household size was 2.57 and the average family size was 3.01.

In the town, the population was spread out, with 26.5% under the age of 18, 3.7% from 18 to 24, 23.5% from 25 to 44, 30.3% from 45 to 64, and 16.0% who were 65 years of age or older.  The median age was 43 years. For every 100 females, there were 91.4 males. For every 100 females age 18 and over, there were 85.4 males.

The median income for a household in the town was $72,359 (2007 est. 92,604 aol.realestate.com), and the median income for a family was $106,126 in 2000. Males had a median income of $61,128 versus $32,500 for females. The per capita income for the town was $47,983. About 1.3% of families and 3.1% of the population were below the poverty line, including 1.5% of those under age 18 and 8.1% of those age 65 or over.

Schools

The Cape Elizabeth School Department consists of Elementary School, Cape Elizabeth Middle School, and Cape Elizabeth High School, all situated in one campus in the town center. The Cape Elizabeth School Department offices are across the street in the Cape Elizabeth Town Hall. Cape Elizabeth has no private educational institutions except preschools and day care centers. The high school had its first graduating class in 1877.

Cape Elizabeth is home to one of the oldest continually operating preschools in the greater Portland area, Ledgemere Country Day School. The school opened in 1935 and has been operating in the same location ever since, under a number of different owners.

Cape Elizabeth school proposed a bill to update the schools. In November 2022 the vote was rejected as the budget was too high.

Government and politics
Cape Elizabeth has a town council-town manager form of government. The seven-member town council is elected at large on a nonpartisan basis to staggered three-year terms. The school board is also a seven-member body elected at large on a nonpartisan basis to staggered three-year terms.

Town council incumbents (term expires):
 James M. "Jamie" Garvin (12/2021) Chair
 Nicole Boucher (12/2023)
 Valerie J. Deveraux (12/2021)
 Jeremy A. Gabrielson (12/2021) 
 Gretchen Noonan (12/2023)	
 Caitlin R. Jordan (12/2022)
 Penelope A. Jordan (12/2022)

The school board incumbents (term expires):
 Heather Altenburg (12/2021) Chair
 Kimberly Carr (12/2022) Vice Chair
 Laura DeNino (12/2021)
 Cynthia McVeigh (12/2023
 Philip Saucier (12/2022)
 Elizabeth Scifres (12/2021)
 Cynthia R. Voltz (12/2023)

The Town Manager since January 30, 2017 is Matthew E. Sturgis.  The Superintendent of Schools is Donna Wolfrom.

Media

Cape Elizabeth is served by a community newspaper, the Cape Courier. The nonprofit, biweekly paper is largely supported by volunteers, and was started by Ellen Van Fleet and Jan Soland in 1988. The Current, a weekly that began publishing in 2001, also serves the town, as well as the neighboring communities of Scarborough and South Portland. The earliest newspaper in town was the Casket, published in 1868 by George Libby, a realtor. The Coast Watch was a weekly newspaper started in 1895, lasting 20 years. In 1881, the Cape Elizabeth Sentinel was published in Ferry Village, now a part of South Portland. This weekly lasted nearly 30 years.

Sites of interest
 Beach to Beacon 10K
 Cape Elizabeth Lights
 Crescent Beach State Park
 Fort Williams Park
 Portland Head Light
 Ram Island Ledge Light
 Spurwink Congregational Church
 Spurwink River
 Two Lights State Park

Notable people 

 Joan Benoit Samuelson, gold medalist in 1984 Olympic Marathon
 Alexander Chee, fiction writer
 George Cleeve, early settler
 Eliot Cutler, lawyer, entrepreneur, politician and candidate for Governor in 2010
 Bette Davis, actress
 Cynthia Dill, lawyer and 2012 Democratic candidate for United States Senate
 Clara L. Brown Dyer (1849–1931), artist 
 Clare Egan, Winter biathlete
 Eleanor Espling, politician
 Nathaniel Fick, diplomat, entrepreneur, author
 John Ford, film director
 Doug Friedman, professional ice hockey player
 Guy Gannett, newspaper publisher
 Richard D. Hewes, lawyer, Speaker of the House of the Maine Legislature, state senator, Cumberland County Commissioner 
 William J. Kayatta, Jr., federal Court of Appeals judge
 Dorothy Bush Koch, sister of former president George W. Bush
 Henry Kramer, classical pianist
 Samuel Longfellow, clergyman and hymn writer
 Jean Ginn Marvin, state legislator
 Nancy Masterton, state representative
 Vincent L. McKusick, former Chief Justice of the Maine Supreme Court
 Gary Merrill, actor 
 Dodge Morgan, sailor, businessman, and publisher
 Michael Murphy, actor of film, television, and the stage
 James C. Oliver, US congressman
 Elizabeth Oakes Smith, poet, writer, and women's rights activist
 Sidney Toler, actor best known for portraying Charlie Chan

References

External links
 Town of Cape Elizabeth official website
 Thomas Memorial Library

 
Towns in Cumberland County, Maine
Populated coastal places in Maine
Portland metropolitan area, Maine
Populated places established in 1628
1628 establishments in the Thirteen Colonies
Casco Bay
Towns in Maine